The city of York, England is famous for its history and tourism, but is also the base of various companies which serve both United Kingdom, Europe and other continents.

It is in the top 10 for the number of firms with 1-250 employees and in the top 15 for the number of firms employing over 250 people. The population of York grew at a rate of 1.4 percent per year between 2005 and 2010, increasing from 189,200 to 202,400. It contributed £5,068m to the UK GVA in 2018.

The following list is based partly upon the York Top 100 Businesses 2019 report by York St John University.

List of companies

See also 

 Lists of companies
 List of companies of the United Kingdom
 List of UK cities by GVA

References 

Companies based in York